Alexei Fedorovich Kozlovsky (15 October 1905, Kiev - 9 January 1977, Tashkent) was a Soviet composer, conductor, folklorist, and academic. He was a collector of Uzbek and Karakalpak folk music which he synthesized with European music traditions in his own compositions. His most well known works are Ferganskaya syuita Lola and the vocal-symphonic poem Tanovar; the latter of which is based on the Uzbeck folk song Kora soch.

Career and education
From 1931-1936 Kozlovsky was a conductor at the Stanislavsky Opera Theatre, and he served as principal conductor of the Uzbek Philharmonic from 1949–1957 and 1960–1966. He is credited with raising the quality of the Uzbek Philharmonic to one of the highest professional caliber. As an academic he was for many years the head of the department of music composition and instrumentation at the Tashkent Conservatory.

From 1917-1919 Kozlovsky studied composition with Boleslav Leopol′dovich Yavorsky at the Kiev Conservatory. He later studied conducting with Aleksandr Borisovich Khessin and composition with Nikolai Myaskovsky and Nikolai Zhilyayev at the Moscow Conservatory.

References

1905 births
1977 deaths
Kyiv Conservatory alumni
Moscow Conservatory alumni
Soviet composers
Soviet folklorists
Soviet conductors (music)